The Roxolani or Rhoxolāni were a Sarmatian people documented between the 2nd century BC and the 4th century AD, first east of the Borysthenes (Dnieper) on the coast of Lake Maeotis (Sea of Azov), and later near the borders of Roman Dacia and Moesia. They are believed to be an offshoot of the Alans.

Name
The name Roxolani is generally interpreted as a compound formed with the Alanic root *rox- (modern Osset.  or  'light, luminous'; Avest. raox-šna- 'luminous, shining') attached to the tribal name Alān. This would make Roxolani an endonym translatable as the 'luminous' or the 'shining Alans'. The name could be linked to aspects of worship or the supernatural, as suggested by the modern Ossetian expression rūxsag ū ('may you be blessed'), addressed to the deceased, or the name Wacyrūxs ('divine light'), mentioned in the Nart sagas.

Historian George Vernadsky suggested that the Rocas (or Rogas), a tribe conquered by the Ostrogoths in the 4th century, may be a corruption of Ruxs-As. He also argued that the Rosomoni mentioned by Jordanes could be also related, and their name interpreted as the 'Ros Men'.

Geography
Their first recorded homeland lay between the Volga, Don and Dnieper rivers; they migrated in the 1st century AD toward the Danube, to what is now the Baragan steppes in Romania.

History

1st century BC
Around 100 BC, they invaded the Crimea under their king Tasius in support of the Scythian warlord Palacus but were defeated by Diophantus, general of Mithradates VI.

1st century AD
In the mid-1st century AD, the Roxolani began incursions across the Danube into Roman territory. One such raid in AD 68/69 was intercepted by the Legio III Gallica with Roman auxiliaries, who destroyed a raiding force of 9,000 Roxolanian cavalry encumbered by baggage. Tacitus (Hist. Bk1.79) describes the weight of the armour worn by the "princes and most distinguished persons" made "it difficult for such as have been overthrown by the charge of the enemy to regain their feet". The long two-handed kontos lance, the primary melee weapon of the Sarmatians, was unusable in these conditions. The Roxolani avenged themselves in AD 92, when they joined the Dacians in destroying the Roman Legio XXI Rapax.

2nd century
During Trajan's Dacian Wars, the Roxolani at first sided with the Dacians, providing them with most of their cavalry strength, but they were defeated in the first campaign of AD 101–102 at Nicopolis ad Istrum. They appear to have stood aside as neutrals during Trajan's final campaign of AD 105–106, which ended in the complete destruction of the Dacian state. The creation of the Roman province of Dacia brought Roman power to the very doorstep of Roxolani territory. The Emperor Hadrian reinforced a series of pre-existing fortifications and built numerous forts along the Danube to contain the Roxolani threat. Later, Marcus Aurelius also campaigned against the Roxolani along the Danubian frontier.

3rd century
They are known to have attacked the Roman Province of Pannonia in 260; shortly afterwards contingents of Roxolani troops entered Roman military service.

4th century
Like other Sarmatian peoples, the Roxolani were conquered by the Huns in the mid-4th century.

Culture
The Greco-Roman historian Strabo (late 1st century BC-early 1st century AD) described them as "wagon-dwellers" (i.e. nomads). According to him, they were the most remote of Scythian peoples.

See also
 Alans
 Aorsi
 Iazyges

References

Sources

Further reading 
 

Ancient tribes in Ukraine
Ancient peoples of Russia
Sarmatian tribes
Alans
Historical Iranian peoples
Iranian nomads
Nomadic groups in Eurasia
Ancient Crimea
Don basin